This Is America may refer to:

Music
This Is America (album), a 1968 album by Kim Weston
"This is America", a song by Kim Weston from the eponymous album
This Is America, a 2013 album by Ashton Shepherd
"This Is America", a 2015 song by Justin Tranchita
"This Is America" (song), a 2018 song by Childish Gambino

Other uses
This Is America (book), a 1942 book by Eleanor Roosevelt and Frances Cooke Macgregor
This Is America, Charlie Brown, a 1988–1989 animated television miniseries
This Is America & the World with Dennis Wholey, a 1998 interview program
This Is America with Jon Elliott, a 2006–2009 Air America radio show

See also
This Is Not America, a 1985 David Bowie song
This is Not America, a 2022 song by Residente, featuring Ibeyi
Who Is America?, a 2018 television series created by Sacha Baron Cohen